William Glenn Brundige (November 13, 1948 – December 29, 2018) was an American football defensive end in the National Football League (NFL) for the Washington Redskins for eight seasons, from 1970 through 1977.  He is currently sixth on the Redskins all-time sack list.

Born in Holyoke, Colorado, Brundige played high school football at tiny Haxtun in northeastern Colorado and then played college football at the University of Colorado in Boulder. He was a physics major at CU and also threw the shot put for the Colorado Buffaloes track and field team. After a senior season in 1969 in which he was named first-team All-America, he was selected in the second round of the 1970 NFL Draft, 43rd overall, by head coach Vince Lombardi of the Redskins.

At age 21, he was a starter as a rookie in 1970 at defensive tackle. At the end of his third season in the NFL, Brundige became a part of both Redskin and Super Bowl lore in Super Bowl VII. He blocked the field goal attempt by Garo Yepremian that led to the bizarre fumble-return touchdown by Mike Bass that cut the Miami Dolphins' lead to 14–7 with just over two minutes remaining.

In 2002 for the Redskins' 70th anniversary, Brundige was named a member of the 70 Greatest Redskins.

After his playing days, Brundige was a general manager of Ford dealerships in the Shenandoah Valley region of Virginia in the city of  Winchester and town of Front Royal.

Brundige died at his home in Knoxville, Tennessee on December 29, 2018, from cancer.

References

External links
 

1948 births
2018 deaths
American football defensive linemen
American male shot putters
Colorado Buffaloes football players
Colorado Buffaloes men's track and field athletes
Washington Redskins players
People from Phillips County, Colorado
Players of American football from Colorado
Track and field athletes from Colorado
Deaths from cancer in Tennessee